is the 10th major single by the Japanese idol group AKB48, the 12th overall and the first on King Records, released on October 22, 2008. It was the first single for Jurina Matsui from SKE48 and also the first AKB48's single to feature a member of the sister group. It reached number 3 in the Oricon weekly singles chart.

Release
This song is also used as the theme song for the AKB48 unit, no3b's drama, "Mendol ~Ikemen Idol~".

Track listing

Regular edition

DVD

Bonus (First press only)
 Handshake event ticket (Tokyo, Aichi, Osaka, Fukuoka)
 Another jacket (19 kinds, all selected members except Jurina Matsui)

Theater Edition
CD

DVD

Bonus (First press only)
 Handshake event ticket (AKB48 Theater, SUNSHINE STUDIO)
 One photo (of 90 different kinds: Team A, K, B, Kenkyusei, SKE48)

Selected members
It was the first selection for Rie Kitahara, Miho Miyazaki, Rino Sashihara, Jurina Matsui. While Rina Nakanishi, Ayaka Umeda, Megumi Ohori, who participated in "Baby! Baby! Baby!", didn't make the selection this time.

(Team affiliation at the time of the release.)

Center : Jurina Matsui.
 Team A: Tomomi Itano, Mai Ōshima, Nozomi Kawasaki, Rie Kitahara, Haruna Kojima, Yukari Satō, Mariko Shinoda, Minami Takahashi, Atsuko Maeda, Minami Minegishi, Miho Miyazaki
 Team K: Sayaka Akimoto, Yūko Ōshima, Erena Ono, Tomomi Kasai, Sae Miyazawa
 Team B: Yuki Kashiwagi, Rino Sashihara, Mayu Watanabe
 SKE48: Jurina Matsui

Charts

*charted in 2010.

Sales and certifications

Other versions
 The Thai idol group BNK48, a sister group of AKB48, covered the song and named it "Ko Chop Hai Ru Wa Chop" ("I Like You, So I Let You Know That I Like You"). First performed on 2 June 2017 at the group's debut event in Bangkok, the song was included on the group's debut single, "Aitakatta – Yak Cha Dai Phop Thoe", officially released on 8 August 2017.
 On June 1, 2022, Spy, a shuffle unit of WACK featuring Yuki Kashiwagi released a cover of the song as a B-side on their single .

References

External links
 KING RECORDS OFFICIAL SITE "Ōgoe Diamond" (CD+DVD)
 King Records special site (Kojima, Maeda, Matsui interview)

2008 singles
Songs with lyrics by Yasushi Akimoto
AKB48 songs
King Records (Japan) singles
2008 songs
BNK48 songs
Japanese television drama theme songs